"Working in the Coal Mine" is a song with music and lyrics by the American musician and record producer Allen Toussaint.  It was an international hit for Lee Dorsey in 1966, and has been recorded by other musicians including Devo in 1981.

Lee Dorsey original version
After Toussaint returned to New Orleans from the U.S. Army, in which he served from 1963 to 1965, he formed a production company, Sansu (also known as "Tou-Sea Productions"), with partner Marshall Sehorn.  He produced a number of singles performed by Lee Dorsey in 1965 and 1966, including "Ride Your Pony" and "Working in the Coal Mine".

Written, arranged and produced by Toussaint, the song concerns the suffering of a man who rises before 5 o'clock each morning in order to work in a coal mine, five days a week, where the conditions are very harsh and dangerous, but which offers the only prospect of paid employment. The singer repeatedly asks the Lord, "How long can this go on?" and complains that when the weekend arrives, he's too exhausted to have any fun. In the instrumental section, as in the song's fade, he says: "Lord, I'm so tired / How long can this go on?"   The song features the sound of a pickaxe clinking, as if the musicians were working in a mine.  Says producer Allen Toussaint "There wasn’t as much percussion as you might think on there. It was a certain drummer and we had my brother hit the mic' stand with a drum stick for the pick sound. Those were the two percussion instruments."

The recording took place at Cosimo Matassa's Governor Nichols Street studio in the French Quarter of New Orleans. Musicians included guitarist Roy Montrell, drummer Albert "June" Gardner, and bassist Walter Payton.

It was a hit for Lee Dorsey, released on Amy Records (catalogue number 958), and entered the U.S. Billboard Hot 100 on July 23, 1966, eventually peaking at #8, while reaching #5 on the Billboard R&B chart.  It also reached #8 on the UK Singles Chart.

Toussaint said that neither he nor Dorsey had ever been down a coal mine: "We didn’t know anything about a coal mine".  He said of Dorsey:
"He was very good to work with. Very inspiring because he had such a happiness about him. He loved what he was doing when he was singing. He was a body and fender man when he wasn’t singing and even at his peak, when he would come off the road at the end of a successful tour, he would go and get into his grease clothes, his dirty work gear and go and work on cars. Straightening out fenders and painting bodywork. But really it was his finest hour when he was singing. He was a very good person for me to work with and he totally trusted me every step of the way."

Over time, Dorsey's version of "Working in the Coal Mine" has been featured in many movies and television programs, including Where the Action Is (1966), Everybody's All-American (1988), Moonlighting (1988), Waiting for the Light (1990), Married... with Children (1990), The Wonder Years (1990), The Fresh Prince of Bel-Air (1993), Casino (1995), Secret Diary of a Call Girl (2010), Muppets Most Wanted (2014), The Simpsons (2019) and The Conners (2019).

Chart history

Devo version

In 1981, a Devo cover version was included as a bonus 7" single packaged with their album New Traditionalists. This version was later included in the soundtracks for the films Heavy Metal and Employee of the Month.  It entered Billboard Sept 5, 1981, reaching No. 43 on the Hot 100, and was also a Top 10 single in New Zealand. It was used as the theme for the show Working.

Chart performance

Other versions
The song was covered by The Judds in 1985, on their album Rockin' with the Rhythm. Over time, it became a fan favorite of the country duo.
The song is also included as a part of a medley performed by Allen Toussaint of some of his hits in the 2005 documentary film Make It Funky!, which presents a history of New Orleans music and its influence on rhythm and blues, rock and roll, funk and jazz.

References

1966 songs
1966 singles
1981 singles
Lee Dorsey songs
Devo songs
Songs written by Allen Toussaint
Warner Records singles
Asylum Records singles
Songs about labor
Songs about mining